Central Coast Roadrunners were an American soccer team, founded in 1996. The team was a member of the United Soccer Leagues Premier Development League (PDL), the fourth tier of the American Soccer Pyramid, until 2002, after which the team left the league and the franchise rights were transferred to the newly formed Fresno Fuego. The Roadrunners were one of the most successful PDL franchises in California, winning the national championship in 1996 and 1997.

Their chairman, Larry Smyth, was inducted into the USL Hall of Fame in 2004, and was the first person to be inducted into the USL Hall of Fame via vote in the Builder category, which has an automatic induction for owners and executives who have served 10 years in the USL.

They played their home games in Mustang Stadium on the grounds of California Polytechnic State University just outside San Luis Obispo, California. The team's colors were blue and white.

Year-by-year

References 

Soccer clubs in California
Defunct Premier Development League teams
Association football clubs established in 1996
Association football clubs disestablished in 2002
1996 establishments in California
2002 disestablishments in California
San Luis Obispo, California